The 2021 Nürburgring Langstrecken Serie was the 44th season of the German endurance series (formerly VLN) run at the Nürburgring Nordschleife, and second run as the Nürburgring Langstrecken Serie (NLS). The season began on 27 March and will end on 9 October.

Calendar

Classes
Entries are split into multiple different classes. Current classes are:

Entry Lists

SP9

SP7

SP8

SP8T

SP10

TCR

Other classes

Results
Results indicates overall winner only in the whole race.

Notes

References

External links
 

Nürburgring Endurance Series
Nürburgring Endurance Series seasons